Rasul Magomedovich Dzhukaev (born August 11, 1984, in Grozny) is a Chechen freestyle wrestler from Russia. He won a silver medal in the 66 kg. division at the 2009 FILA World Championships. In Russian National Freestyle Wrestling Championships 2015 he won bronze medal in 2017.

References 

Russian male sport wrestlers
1984 births
Living people
Chechen martial artists
Russian people of Chechen descent
Chechen people
World Wrestling Championships medalists
European Wrestling Championships medalists
20th-century Russian people
21st-century Russian people